The 1873 Bath by-election was fought on 6 May 1873. The byelection was fought due to the Death of the incumbent MP of the Liberal Party, Sir William Tite.  It was won by the Conservative candidate Viscount Chelsea.

References

1873 in England
Politics of Bath, Somerset
1873 elections in the United Kingdom
By-elections to the Parliament of the United Kingdom in Somerset constituencies
19th century in Somerset